is a railway station operated by JR West on the Gantoku Line in Kudamatsu, Yamaguchi.

Adjacent stations
West Japan Railway (JR West)

History 

March 28, 1934: Station opens
April 1, 1987: Station operation is taken over by JR West after privatization of Japanese National Railways

See also
 List of railway stations in Japan

External links
  
 Kudamatsu City website 

Railway stations in Japan opened in 1934
Railway stations in Yamaguchi Prefecture